Jacob Leicht (May 30, 1876 – April 12, 1941) was an American farmer and politician.

Born in South Germantown, Washington County, Wisconsin, Leicht went to Northern Illinois Normal School and Valparaiso University. He was a farmer. He married Ruth Hollencamp, with whom he had six children. Leicht served as chairman of the town of Germantown, school district officer, and served on the Washington County Board of Supervisors and was chairman of the county board. Leicht served in the Wisconsin State Assembly in 1925 and was a Republican. Leicht became a member of the board of the Milwaukee Co-Operative Milk Producers' Association in 1940. He died at his home in Germantown, Wisconsin.

Notes

1876 births
1941 deaths
People from Germantown, Wisconsin
Farmers from Wisconsin
Northern Illinois University alumni
Valparaiso University alumni
School board members in Wisconsin
Mayors of places in Wisconsin
County supervisors in Wisconsin
Republican Party members of the Wisconsin State Assembly